13 is the third and final studio album by the band Second Coming, and the only one to feature guitarist Eric Snyder. Before releasing 13, the band put out a companion acoustic EP featuring five of the tracks.

Track listing
All tracks written by Bacolas, Bergstrom, Bracht and Snyder, except where noted.

Personnel

Second Coming
Johnny Bacolas — bass guitar
James Bergstrom — drums
Travis Bracht — vocals
Eric Snyder — guitar

Production
13
Produced by Kelly Gray and Rob Daiker 
Engineered by Rob Daiker and Dave Hillis
Design by Alex Hart
Photography – Scott Corl
Acoustic
Produced by Second Coming and Shad Woodman
Engineered and mixed by Shad Woodman
Design by Alex Hart and Scott Corl

References

2003 albums
Second Coming (band) albums